Sandra-Maria Jensen (born 5 April 1994) is a Danish badminton player. Born in Bulgaria, Jensen and her family moved to Denmark when she was four. At the age of fifteen, she was selected to join the national U-19 team to compete at the 2009 World Junior Championships as the younger player in the squad. She won the bronze medal at the 2010 World Junior Championships in the girls' doubles event partnered with Line Kjærsfeldt, and at the European Junior Championships, she helped the team win a bronze in 2011 and a gold in 2013, also settled a bronze medal in the girls' doubles event in 2011. Jensen joined the national elite squad that won the European Women's Team Championships in 2014 and the European Mixed Team Championships in 2015.

Achievements

BWF World Junior Championships 
Girls' doubles

European Junior Championships 
Girls' doubles

BWF International Challenge/Series 
Women's singles

Women's doubles

  BWF International Challenge tournament
  BWF International Series tournament
  BWF Future Series tournament

References

External links 
 

1994 births
Living people
Danish female badminton players
Bulgarian expatriate sportspeople in Denmark
21st-century Danish women